Charles L. Freeman (August 21, 1908 April 10, 2001) was an American sound editor and film editor who worked on both television and film.

Awards
He won an Academy Award for Best Special Effects during the 21st Academy Awards for his work on the fantasy film Portrait of Jennie (1948). He shared the award with Paul Eagler, Joseph McMillan Johnson, Russell Shearman, Clarence Slifer, and James G. Stewart.

In addition, Freeman won an Emmy Award for the editing on the police drama television series Naked City.

Filmography
Since You Went Away (1944)
Duel in the Sun (1944)
Portrait of Jennie (1946)
Battle Taxi (1955)
Fight for the Title (1957) (short film)
Operation Bikini (1963)
Dead Men Tell No Tales (1971)
Fireball Forward (1972)

Television shows
Passport to Danger 
Mackenzie's Raiders 
Telephone Time
Lock Up
This Man Dawson
Naked City
Survival
Peyton Place
Lancer
Hawaii Five-O

See also

 List of people from Los Angeles
 List of Primetime Emmy Award winners

References

External links

Place of birth missing
1908 births
2001 deaths
American film editors
Best Visual Effects Academy Award winners
People from Sherman Oaks, Los Angeles
Primetime Emmy Award winners
American sound editors
American television editors